Saint-Malo station (French: Gare de Saint-Malo) is a railway station serving the town Saint-Malo, Ille-et-Vilaine department, western France.

The station is situated on the Rennes–Saint-Malo railway.

Services

The station is served by high speed trains to Rennes and Paris, and regional trains to Dol-de-Bretagne and Rennes.

References

Railway stations in Ille-et-Vilaine
TER Bretagne
Railway stations in France opened in 1864
Buildings and structures completed in 2005
21st-century architecture in France